Allomerus is a Neotropical genus of small ants in the subfamily Myrmicinae. Its eight species are known from the forests of South America, where they live in plant cavities and structures.

Species
Allomerus brevipilosus Fernández, 2007
Allomerus decemarticulatus Mayr, 1878
Allomerus dentatus Fernández, 2007
Allomerus maietae Fernández, 2007
Allomerus octoarticulatus Mayr, 1878
Allomerus septemarticulatus Mayr, 1878
Allomerus undecemarticulatus Fernández, 2007
Allomerus vogeli Kempf, 1975

Associated plants
Table of known ant–host relations:

References

External links

Myrmicinae
Ant genera
Hymenoptera of South America